Barada SC is a Syrian football club based in Damascus.

History

The team played many seasons in Syrian Premier League, the top division of Syrian football. In 1968–1969 and 1969–1970 the club has won Syrian Premier League.

The team dissolved in 1972, but was later reestablished in 1992.

Stadium
Barada SC play at the 12,000 capacity Al-Fayhaa Stadium.

Honours
Syrian Premier League: 2 
Winners: 1969, 1970
Syrian Cup: 1
Runners-up: 1965

References

External links

Football clubs in Syria
Sport in Damascus
Association football clubs established in 1927
1927 establishments in Mandatory Syria